Polynoncus peruanus is a species of hide beetle in the subfamily Omorginae found in Peru, Argentina, Bolivia, and Chile.

References

peruanus
Beetles described in 1847
Beetles of South America
Taxa named by Wilhelm Ferdinand Erichson